The following is a list of episodes of Speed Racer: The Next Generation. The series debuted on Nicktoons Network on May 2, 2008, and ended on August 25, 2013.

Series overview

Episodes

Season 1: 2008–09

Season 2: 2011, 2013

DVD releases

Season 1
The first DVD of the series was released on May 6, 2008, by Lionsgate Home Entertainment; it contains the first movie, or first three episodes. The DVD was released in North America and other NTSC regions on May 6, 2008; a PAL release has not yet eventuated. A second DVD containing the second 3-part episode, "The Fast Track", and more bonus features, was released on October 7, 2008. "Comet Run" was released on May 12, 2009.

References

External links
 
 TV Guide.com's Speed Racer: TNG episode list
 TV.com's Speed Racer: TNG episode guide

Lists of American children's animated television series episodes